Anna Rita Angotzi (born 12 February 1967 in Oristano), known as Rita Angotzi, is an Italian former sprinter.

Biography
She participated at the 1988 Summer Olympics.

Achievements

See also
 Italian all-time lists - 100 metres
 Italy national relay team - All the medals

References

External links
 

1967 births
Living people
Italian female sprinters
Athletes (track and field) at the 1988 Summer Olympics
Olympic athletes of Italy
Mediterranean Games silver medalists for Italy
Mediterranean Games bronze medalists for Italy
Athletes (track and field) at the 1991 Mediterranean Games
World Athletics Championships athletes for Italy
Mediterranean Games medalists in athletics
Olympic female sprinters